The Melkite Greek Catholic Eparchy of Saint Michael Archangel (Latin: Eparchia Sancti Michaëlis Sydneyensis Graecorum Melkitarum) is based in Sydney suburb of Darlington, Australia. The eparchy is administered by Bishop Robert Rabbat. The Rt. Rev. Abdallah Sayegh is the current vicar general. The eparchy was established in March 1987.

Territory and statistics

The eparchy includes all Catholic faithful of the Melkite Greek Catholic Church in Australia and New Zealand. Its eparchial seat is in the town of Darlington, a suburb of Sydney, in New South Wales, where is located the Cathedral of St. Michael and All Angels.

The territory is divided into 13 parishes and there were 50,000 Catholics in 2010.

History

In the mid-19th century began the migration of Christians of the Melkite Greek Catholic Church to Australia. The first colonies fixed in Sydney, Brisbane and Melbourne, and later settled in other regions. After the number of believers was significantly increased, the need arose to exercise faith and the Eucharist in the Byzantine rite.

In 1889, an Archimandrite of the Basilian Chouerite Order of St. John the Baptist, Silwanos Mansour, was from Baalbek in Lebanon to Australia to visit his parents. At the request of the faithful, he remained, after he had obtained the administering approval of the Church in Sydney. Mansour began with the collection of donations, and in 1891 the cornerstone of the first church of the Melkite Greek Catholic community are placed. The foundation stone of the church was blessed by Bishop Higgins on behalf of the Roman Catholic Archbishop Patrick Francis Moran of Sydney. The dedication of the church took place in 1895 and was a meeting place for the Christian faithful from various Eastern Churches. Since 1895 at the church is sided the name "Saint Michael Archangel" Cathedral. Pope John Paul II implemented the eparchy with the Apostolic constitution Quae quantaque on 26 March 1987. The territory of the diocese is covering also New Zealand since 22 September 1999 when Pope John Paul II, by decree of the Congregation for the Oriental Churches, extended the jurisdiction of Eparchy also to the faithful of the Melkites in New Zealand.

Bishops
George Riashi, B.C. (26 March 1987 – 28 July 1995), appointed Archbishop of Tripoli del Libano {Tarabulus} (Melkite Greek)
Issam John Darwich, BSO, D.D. (4 August 1995 – 15 June 2011), appointed Archbishop of Zahleh e Furzol (Melkite Greek), Lebanon
Robert Rabbat (15 June 2011 – present)

See also

 Roman Catholicism in Australia

References

External links
Melkite Catholic Eparchy of Australia & New Zealand

 https://web.archive.org/web/20150227045049/http://melkite.org.au/history.aspx
 http://www.gcatholic.org/dioceses/diocese/zmic0.htm
 http://www.pgc-lb.org/fre/melkite_greek_catholic_church/Eparchy-of-Sydney-Australia-and-New-Zealand

1987 establishments in Australia
Lebanese Australian
Melkite Greek Catholic eparchies
Melkite Greek Catholic Church in Australia
Christian organizations established in 1987
Roman Catholic dioceses and prelatures established in the 20th century
Eastern Catholic dioceses in Oceania
Darlington, New South Wales
Arab-Australian culture